Michael Horace Cook (born August 14, 1963) is an American former professional baseball player who played five seasons for the California Angels, Minnesota Twins, and Baltimore Orioles of Major League Baseball (MLB). He struck out John Cangelosi looking for his first MLB strikeout. Mike is married to Carla Cook from Charleston, SC.

External links

Mike Cook at Baseball Gauge
Venezuela Winter League

1963 births
Living people
All-American college baseball players
American expatriate baseball players in Canada
Baltimore Orioles players
Baseball players from South Carolina
Calgary Cannons players
California Angels players
Edmonton Trappers players
Leones del Caracas players
American expatriate baseball players in Venezuela
Louisville Redbirds players
Major League Baseball pitchers
Midland Angels players
Minnesota Twins players
Norfolk Tides players
Portland Beavers players
Quad Cities Angels players
Rochester Red Wings players
South Carolina Gamecocks baseball players
Sportspeople from Charleston, South Carolina